Viegas is a Portuguese surname of visigothic origin. Notable people with the surname include:

Acacio Gabriel Viegas (1856–1933), Indian physician
Brás Viegas (1553–1599), Portuguese Jesuit
Fabiano Cezar Viegas (born 1975), Brazilian footballer
Fernanda Viégas, Brazilian information scientist
Frederico Viegas (born 1974), Portuguese racing driver
Manuela Viegas (born 1957), Portuguese film director and editor
João Viegas Carrascalão (1945–2012), East Timorese politician
Joelma Viegas (born 1986), Angolan handball player
José Viegas Filho (born 1942), Brazilian diplomat
Ricardo Viegas (born 1992), Portuguese footballer

References

Portuguese-language surnames